Diane Mary Craig (born 1949), sometimes credited as Di Craig, is a Northern Irish-born Australian actress best known for her performances in film and television.

She was born in County Down, and since 1971 has been married to award-winning Australian actor and comedian Garry McDonald.

Career

Film 

She attended the prestigious National Institute of Dramatic Arts (NIDA), but left after a year, making her debut in 1970 starring in the British Australian feature film Ned Kelly (1970), alongside Mick Jagger. Her other film appearances included roles in The Mango Tree (1977), Double Deal (1981), The Highest Honor (1982), Travelling North (1987) and A Sting in the Tail (1989).

Television 

Craig has also appeared on the small screen in numerous serials, mini-series and telemovies. She is probably best known for the long-running roles in The Restless Years and E Street  (replacing actress Penny Cook as Dr. Elly Fielding), as well as appearing several times in the cult television series Prisoner. Craig's last long-running role was as Deborah McManus in the 2008 series Out of the Blue.

Filmography 
FILM

TELEVISION

Notes

References 

1949 births
Living people
Australian television actresses
Australian film actresses
Northern Ireland emigrants to Australia
People from County Down
Television actresses from Northern Ireland
20th-century Australian actresses
21st-century Australian actresses